WTSX may refer to:

 WTSX-LP, a low-power radio station (104.9 FM) licensed to serve Kokomo, Indiana, United States
 WVPO (FM), a radio station (96.7 FM) licensed to serve Lehman Township, Pennsylvania, United States, which held the call sign WTSX from 1984 to 2012